Elseya flaviventralis, the yellow bellied snapping turtle, is a species of large river snapping turtles from the Arnhem Land region of the Northern Territory of Australia. It is a member of the nominate subgenus Elseya.

Etymology 
This species is named for the yellow colored plastron unique among the Australian members of the genus. All other members having at least some degree of black coloration.

References

Elseya (Elseya)
Reptiles described in 2016
Taxa named by Scott A. Thomson
Turtles of Australia